Cullin-5 is a protein that in humans is encoded by the CUL5 gene.

Discovery
The mammalian gene product was originally discovered by expression cloning, due to the protein's ability to mobilize intracellular calcium in response to the peptide hormone arginine vasopressin.  It was first titled VACM-1, for vasopressin-activated, calcium-mobilizing receptor.  Since then, VACM-1 has been shown to be homologous to the Cullin family of proteins, and was subsequently dubbed cul5.

Tissue distribution
Studies have shown that the cul5 protein is expressed at its highest levels in heart and skeletal tissue, and is specifically expressed in vascular endothelium and renal collecting tubules.

Function
Cul5 inhibits cellular proliferation, potentially through its involvement in the SOCS/ BC-box/ eloBC/ cul5/ RING E3 ligase complex, which functions as part of the ubiquitin system for protein degradation.

One study have shown that Cul5 plays a role in Reelin signaling cascade, participating in the DAB1 degradation and thus ensuring the negative feedback mechanism of Reelin signaling during corticogenesis.

Interactions
CUL5 has been shown to interact with RBX1.

References

External links

Further reading